Hippos in Tanks was a record label founded in 2010 by Barron Machat and Travis Woolsey.  The label specialized in electronic music. It was named the best label of 2011 by FACT. Following the death of Machat in 2015, The Fader praised the label for "laying the groundwork to an alternative template for the avant-garde." The label is no longer active.

History
In 2009, Machat and Woolsey—who met while working at an online company in Los Angeles—were asked to host a radio show on KXLU called Hippos in Tanks.  It was named after the novel by Jack Kerouac and William S. Burroughs And the Hippos Were Boiled in Their Tanks . After leaving the company to work on their label full-time, HIT released their first EP from Von Haze in June 2010. In 2011 Woolsey left the label with Machat staying on as CEO.

According to Dean Blunt in 2014, Hippos in Tanks sued him for $10,000 over contract disputes. The dispute was resolved when his label at the time, Rough Trade Records, paid Hippos in Tanks the $10,000.

Hippos in Tanks closed following the death of Barron Machat on April 8, 2015. The label is now part of Machat Entertainment.

The label would become associated with Internet age experimental pop that drew on disparate sources such as new wave, avant-garde noise, R&B, and techno. The label released projects by artists such as Grimes, James Ferraro, Autre Ne Veut, Laurel Halo, Hype Williams, and Arca.

Hippos In Tanks founder Barron Machat died in a car crash in Miami, Florida, on April 8, 2015.

The label has been inactive since late 2015.

Artists / Alumni
 ADR
 Arca
 Autre Ne Veut
 Dean Blunt
 d'Eon
 Games
 Gatekeeper
 Goth Money
 Grimes
 Hype Williams
 Inga Copeland
 James Ferraro aka BODYGUARD
 Laurel Halo
 Nguzunguzu
 Outer Limitz
 Physical Therapy
Sleep ∞ Over
 Triad God
 Von Haze
 White Car
 Wilder
 Yung Lean

References

Electronic music record labels